Craig Stephen Faller (born 1961) is a retired United States Navy admiral. A 1983 graduate of the United States Naval Academy and a native of Fryburg, Pennsylvania, he earned a Bachelor of Science in Systems Engineering. He earned his master's in national security affairs (strategic planning) from the Naval Postgraduate School in 1990.

Faller assumed duty as senior military assistant to the secretary of defense in January 2017. In that position, he served as the principal military advisor and assistant to the secretary of defense. On November 26, 2018, he succeeded Admiral Kurt W. Tidd as commander of United States Southern Command.

Naval career
Finally, as commander, Carrier Strike Group 3, he deployed to the Middle East supporting Operations New Dawn (Iraq) and Enduring Freedom (Afghanistan).

Ashore, Faller was assigned to chief of legislative affairs for the Secretary of the Navy; served as Deputy Chief of Naval Operations (Plans, Policy and Operations); served as a legislative fellow on the staff of Senator Edward M. Kennedy; served as head of Surface Nuclear Officer Programs and Placement at Navy Personnel Command and served as executive assistant to the Chief of naval operations. Finally, he served as commander, Navy Recruiting Command; as executive assistant to the commander, United States Pacific Command and commander, United States Central Command; and as Director of Operations, United States Central Command.

He retired from active duty on October 29, 2021, relinquishing command of SOUTHCOM to General Laura J. Richardson.

Awards and decorations

Admiral Faller also received the Navy Recruiter Badge with gold wreath.

References

1961 births
Living people
People from Clarion County, Pennsylvania
United States Naval Academy alumni
Naval Postgraduate School alumni
Recipients of the Legion of Merit
United States Navy admirals
Recipients of the Defense Superior Service Medal
Recipients of the Navy Distinguished Service Medal
Recipients of the Defense Distinguished Service Medal
Military personnel from Pennsylvania